The tuber of vermis, the most posterior division of the inferior vermis, is of small size, and laterally spreads out into the large inferior semilunar lobules, which comprise at least two-thirds of the inferior surface of the hemisphere.

Additional Images

References 

Cerebellum